Misleidis Martínez (born 9 March 1983) is a retired Cuban volleyball player.

She was a member of the Cuba women's national volleyball team. She participated at the 2001 FIVB World Grand Prix, and 2002 FIVB World Grand Prix.

References

External links 
 Player bio, FIVB

1983 births
Living people
Cuban women's volleyball players
Place of birth missing (living people)